Seac Pai Van, also romanized as Siac Pai Van, is an area and former bay in Macau. 

Located south of the Cotai Strip and on the northeastern parts of the former island of Coloane, Seac Pai Van was originally a bay that separated the island from Taipa but, as of 2014, it has been reclaimed from the sea as a part of the combined island of Cotai.

History
The Land, Public Works and Transport Bureau of Macau announced on September 11, 2009 its plans to build a brand new living area in Seac Pai Van with a population of 60,000, covering an area of about 300,000 square meters. Public housing was also to be built. In order to maintain the positioning of Coloane as the lung of Macau, the area would be heavily greened near the Luen Seng Industrial Estate and adjacent quarry, both of which were originally lacking in greenery, so as to harmonize the area with the scenery of the adjacent Seac Pai Van Park. In line with the government's environmental policies, natural gas was also to be introduced to the area.

In 2013, the Health Bureau of Macau moved its health service station in Coloane to Loc Kuan Mansion.

Public housing
Seac Pai Van’s public housing flats are collectively known as the Seac Pai Van Public Housing Complex, which had four public housing projects built as of 2013. Those four public housing projects have names with such meanings as “security”, “housing”, “happiness”, and “business”. They include Edificio On Son, Edificio Koi Nga, Edificio Loc Kuan, and Edificio Ip Hing, all of which can accommodate a combined total of up to 50,000 people. Many government departments have also set up offices in this public housing complex.

Transport
Seac Pai Van is connected to the rest of Macau by the Cotai Highway. There are 6 bus stops in the area, namely Avenida Butterfly Valley Terminus, Alameda da Harmonia/Edificio Ip Hing, Alameda da Harmonia/Edificio Loc Kuan, Avenida de Loc Koi/Edificio Loc Kuan, Avenida de Loc Koi/Edificio Koi Nga, and Edificio On Son.

A Macau LRT connection to this area, the Seac Pai Van line, is also in the planning stages.

See also
 Praia Grande Bay
 Hac Sa Beach

References

Water in Macau